Jamal was elected to parliament from Bakerganj Cum Pirojpur as a Bangladesh Nationalist Party candidate in 2001. He served as the whip of the parliament.

Syed Shahidul Haque Jamal, son of late Syed Bazlul Haque and late Mst. Halima Khatun, was born to a renowned Muslim family in Barisal. He was the 9th generation offspring of Hazrat Syed Ahmed Fakir (R.U.)-1695, alongside three brothers and two sisters. He started his business in the mid-60s. Along with taking part in numerous businesses including maritime transport and trading, he was also involved in the glass industry, crock industry, cold storage, textile industry, and was a founder member of Dhaka Stock Exchange Limited. He has done many charitable and social work in his lifetime. He has built many schools, colleges, mosques and madrasas.

Career
Jamal was elected to parliament from Bakerganj Cum Pirojpur as a Bangladesh Nationalist Party candidate in 2001. He served as the whip of the parliament.

He was the

Founder member of BNP

Former elected Vice-Chairman of Bangladesh Red Cross Society (1984-1986)

Former Member of Bangladesh Parliament (1991, 1996 & 2001)

Former Chairman of Bangladesh Red Cresent Society (1991-1996)

Former Advisor to the President of World Red Cross & Red Cresent Society (1993-1997)

Former Whip, Bangladesh Parliament (2002- 2006)

Former Divisional Minister of Bangladesh (2003-2006)

Former Advisor to the Chairperson of BNP

He took his last breath at 9:17 am on 18 March 2020, in Mount Elizabeth Hospital, Singapore. He has left behind his wife, three sons, one daughter, one son-in-law, two daughters-in-law, four grandsons five granddaughters, many relatives and well wishers.

Death 
Jamal died on 18 March 2020 in Mount Elizabeth Hospital, Singapore.

References

1940s births
2020 deaths
Bangladesh Nationalist Party politicians
8th Jatiya Sangsad members
5th Jatiya Sangsad members
6th Jatiya Sangsad members